Roonstrasse Synagogue, located in Cologne, Germany, is the only surviving of the five synagogues of the city before the Nazi era.

History
The Jewish community in Cologne has the longest history in Germany, being first mentioned in 321. Expelled in 1424, the Jews did not return to Cologne until 1798. In 1815 the community numbered 150, growing to 8000 in 1895, and 18,281 by 1933, the largest in Germany after Berlin.

The foundation stone of the Neo-Romanesque style building, designed by Cologne architects Schreiterer & Below, was laid on October 23, 1895, and the inauguration took place on March 22, 1899. Like all the other synagogues on the city it was attacked and set alight on the night of November 9, 1938, known as Kristallnacht, the nationwide attacks on Jewish businesses and synagogues. It was further damaged during World War Two, with the front portion was completely destroyed leaving only the burnt out tower and central section. Returned to the surviving Jewish community in 1945, in the late 1950s they decided to completely rebuild, as it was the only one not completely destroyed. The reconstruction was under the direction of the architect Helmut Goldschmidt, with minor changes on the outside and a simplified interior (with new leadlight windows by Lammers & Warzager), and was reopened on September 20, 1959. On Christmas Eve of that year, the Synagogue was smeared with anti-Jewish slogans by members of the far-right Deutsche Reichspartei. West German Chancellor Konrad Adenauer, who had been mayor of Cologne from 1917 until removed by the Nazi government in 1933, made the desecration the subject in his New Year's speech. Since then it has been center of Jewish community of Cologne, and consists of a community center, a small display of items associated with Cologne Jewry, and a kosher restaurant. The interior of the reconstructed synagogue has a vast blue dome.

On August 19, 2005, Pope Benedict XVI visited Roonstrasse Synagogue. This visit was the second ever visit to any synagogue by any one of the Popes. There, he condemned Nazism and antisemitism.

Gallery

See also 

 German language entry : Koln Synagogue
 History of the Jews in Cologne

External links
 A page from the Time Magazine
"Pope Warns of Increase in Anti-Semitism", WorldWide Religious News, David McHugh, August 19, 2005.

References 

Synagogues in Cologne
Synagogues in North Rhine-Westphalia
Innenstadt, Cologne
Orthodox synagogues in Germany
Synagogues completed in 1899
Synagogues completed in 1959
Rebuilt synagogues
Synagogue buildings with domes
Synagogues destroyed during Kristallnacht (Germany)